Chin Up Chin Up is an album by American indie pop band Chin Up Chin Up and was released in 2002. It was re-released with bonus tracks in 2005.

Track listing
 Collide The Tide [4:17]
 Fuck You, Elton John [3:32]
 For All The Tanning Salons In Texas [4:02]	
 The Soccer Mom Gets Her Fix [3:29]
 I'm Not Asking For A Tennis Bracelet [4:13]		
 Pillage The Village [4:07]
 We Should Have Never Lived Like We Were Skyscrapers (Stephen Snydacker Mix) [2:56]
 Falconz And Vulcanz (Acoustic) [4:16]
 The Architect Has A Gun (Ronald Simmons/Gene McDonald Mix) [3:31]

2005 albums
Chin Up Chin Up albums